The Turanid race was a supposed sub-race of the Caucasian race in the context of a now-outdated model of dividing humanity into different races which was developed originally by Europeans in support of colonialism. The Turanid type was traditionally held to be most common among the populations native to Central Asia. The name is taken from the phylum of Turanian languages, which are the combination of the Uralic and Altaic families, hence also referred to as the term Ural–Altaic race.

History 
Anthropologists of the 19th and early 20th century posited the existence of a Turanid racial type or "minor race" as a subtype of the Caucasoid race with some Mongoloid admixture, situated at the boundary of the distribution of the Mongoloid and Caucasoid races.

The idea of a Turanid race came to play a role of some significance in Pan-Turkism or Turanism in the late 19th to 20th century. A "Turkish race" was proposed as a Caucasoid subtype in European literature of the period. 

There was also an ideology of Hungarian Turanism most lively in the second half of the 19th century and in the first half of the 20th century.

See also
 Irano-Afghan race
 Caspian race

References

Further reading 
 Leon Cahun L’histoire de l’Asie (1896).
 Ilse Schwidetzky, Turaniden-Studien, Akademie der Wissenschaften und der Literatur,  F. Steiner Verlag, Mainz, (1950).

Historical definitions of race